Ayatollah Seyed Ali Akbar Ghoreishi (born 1928 in Bonab, East Azerbaijan) is an Iranian Shiite cleric, author and politician. He is a member of 1st, 2nd, 3rd 4th and 5th Assembly of Experts from electorate West Azerbaijan. Ghoreishi won with 549,011 votes. Emblem of Research by Mahmoud Ahmadinejad, he was awarded. his son Mehdi Ghoreishi is representative of the Supreme Leader in West Azerbaijan and Imam Jumu'ah Friday prayer of Urmia.

Works
 Quran and Friendship Ahl al-Bayt
 History of Ahl al-Bayt

References

External links
 

People from East Azerbaijan Province
People from Urmia
Members of the Assembly of Experts
Living people
1928 births
Recipients of the Order of Research